Egbert Haverkamp-Begemann OON (6 March 1923 – 5 August 2017) was a Dutch American art historian and professor.

Career
Born in Naarden, Haverkamp-Begemann spent most of his childhood in Kemerovo and Moscow in Russia, where his father worked as an engineer. After a year in Morocco, the family returned to the Netherlands in the late 1930s. Haverkamp-Begemann finished high school in Dordrecht, and initially studied law, but soon turned to art history. He completed a Doctor of Philosophy in Art History with honors at Utrecht University in 1958. Haverkamp-Begemann's dissertation was on the Dutch Golden Age painter Willem Pieterszoon Buytewech, which was supervised by Jan Gerrit van Gelder.

In 1950, Haverkamp-Begemann was hired as Curator of Drawings, and later Curator of Paintings, at the Museum Boijmans Van Beuningen in Rotterdam. In 1959, he moved to the United States to conduct research at the Princeton University Institute for Advanced Study, as well as at Harvard University. In the following year, Haverkamp-Begemann was named Curator of Drawings and Prints of the Yale University Art Gallery, a position which he held until 1974. In his final four years there, he chaired that department. Haverkamp-Begemann also taught art history at the school.

In 1965, Haverkamp-Begemann received a Guggenheim Fellowship in Fine Arts Research.

In 1978, Haverkamp-Begemann began a long tenure at the New York University Institute of Fine Arts. He was named John Langeloth Loeb Professor in the History of Art, which later turned into an emeritus position upon retirement in 1988. He also would become Curator of Dutch and Flemish Paintings at the Metropolitan Museum of Art. From 2001 to 2004, Haverkamp-Begemann served as Acting Head of the Department of Prints and Drawings at The Morgan Library & Museum.

In 1983, Anne-Marie S. Logan and other colleagues published a festschrift in honor of Haverkamp-Begemann titled Essays in Northern European Art: Presented to Egbert Haverkamp-Begemann on his Sixtieth Birthday.

Haverkamp-Begemann was named an Officer of the Order of Orange Nassau. He died in New York City in 2017.

Works
 Creative Copies: Interpretative Drawings from Michelangelo to Picasso
 Rembrandt, the Nightwatch 
 Art And Autoradiography: Insights Into The Genesis Of Paintings By Rembrandt, Van Dyck And Vermeer 
 The Robert Lehman Collection
 The Robert Lehman Collection at the Metropolitan Museum of Art

See also
List of Guggenheim Fellowships awarded in 1965
List of Rembrandt connoisseurs and scholars
List of works about Rembrandt

References

External links
New York Times obituary

1923 births
2017 deaths
People from Naarden
Dutch expatriates in the Soviet Union
Dutch expatriates in Morocco
American art historians
Dutch art historians
American art curators
Dutch art curators
American people of Dutch descent
Dutch emigrants to the United States
Utrecht University alumni
Yale University faculty
New York University faculty
Scholars of Netherlandish art
Rembrandt scholars
Officers of the Order of Orange-Nassau
People associated with the Metropolitan Museum of Art